The 435th Fighter Training Squadron is part of the 12th Flying Training Wing based at Randolph Air Force Base, Texas. It operates Northrop AT-38 Talon aircraft conducting flight training.

Mission
The 435 FTS conducts initial instructor and student flying training for over 130 U.S. Air Force and international pilots and Weapon System Operators annually in Introduction to Fighter Fundamentals. The squadron develops students' proficiency, confidence, discipline, judgment, and situational awareness of basic fighter employment. Additionally, the squadron deploys to support fighter syllabus/operational training requirements for Dissimilar Air Combat Training.

History

World War II
The 435th flew air defense prior to overseas duty then flew combat in the European Theater of Operations from, 26 May 1944 – 25 April 1945.

Tactical Air Command

Vietnam War

A detachment operated under the 8th Tactical Fighter Wing detachment at Udorn RTAFB, Thailand, 5 Jun-c. 23 July 1966 It conducted air defense in Southeast Asia from, 12 October-20 December 1965 and combat sorties from, July 1966-15 August 1973.

Training
The squadron trained fighter pilots and weapon systems officers between January 1977 and February 1991. It conducted training for Taiwan Air Force pilots from, May 1993-c. 31 December 1995 and Introduction to Fighter Fundamentals training for international students from, 1998–2004.

Lineage
 Constituted as the 435th Fighter Squadron (Two Engine) on 12 October 1943
 Activated on 15 October 1943
 Redesignated 435th Fighter Squadron, Single Engine on 5 September 1944
 Inactivated on 15 December 1945
 Redesignated 435th Fighter-Bomber Squadron on 15 October 1952
 Activated on 1 December 1952
 Redesignated 435th Fighter-Day Squadron on 15 February 1954
 Redesignated 435th Tactical Fighter Squadron on 1 July 1958
 Inactivated 8 August 1974
 Redesignated 435th Tactical Fighter Training Squadron on 22 October 1976
 Activated on 1 January 1977
 Inactivated on 19 February 1991
 Redesignated 435th Fighter Squadron on 1 May 1993
 Activated on 12 May 1993
 Inactivated on 1 April 1997
 Redesignated 435th Flying Training Squadron on 2 April 1998
 Activated on 14 May 1998
 Redesignated 435th Fighter Training Squadron on 19 May 2003

Assignments
 479th Fighter Group, 15 October 1943
 VIII Fighter Command, 1–15 December 1945
 479 Fighter-Bomber Group (later 479 Fighter-Day Group), 1 December 1952 (attached to Iceland Defense Force until 27 March 1953)
 Attached to Air Proving Ground Command, 26 July–6 September 1955)
 479th Fighter-Day Wing (later 479th Tactical Fighter Wing), 8 October 1957
 Attached to
 16th Air Force, 7 December 1960 – c. 15 April 1961
 86th Air Division, 19 September 1961 – 22 January 1962, 17 October–c. 30 November 1962
 65th Air Division, 15 December 1960 – 14 April 1961, 3 August–17 October 1962, 30 November–19 December 1962, 30 March–23 June 1964
 2d Air Division, 12 October–20 December 1965
 8th Tactical Fighter Wing, 24 July 1966 – 8 August 1974
 479th Tactical Training Wing, 1 January 1977 – 19 February 1991
 49th Operations Group, 12 May 1993 – 1 April 1997
 12th Operations Group, 14 May 1998
 479th Flying Training Group, 1 October 2001
 12th Operations Group, 2 March 2007 – present)

Stations

 Grand Central Air Terminal, California, 15 October 1943
 Oxnard Airstrip, California, 6 February 1944
 Santa Maria Army Air Field, California, 6–15 April 1944
 RAF Wattisham (Station 377), England, 15 May 1944 – c. 9 December 1945
 Camp Kilmer, New Jersey, 14–15 December 1945
 George Air Force Base, California, 1 December 1952 – 19 July 1966
 Deployed to: 
 Naval Air Station Keflavik, 1 December 1952 – 27 March 1953
 North Auxiliary Airfield, South Carolina, 26 July–6 September 1955
 Morón Air Base, Spain, 7 December 1960–c. 15 April 1961, 3 August–17 October 1962, c. 30 November–19 December 1962, 30 March–23 June 1964
 Ramstein Air Base, Germany, 19 September 1961 – 22 January 1962
 Hahn Air Base, Germany, 17 October–c. 30 November 1962
 Da Nang Air Base, South Vietnam and Kung Kuan Air Base, Taiwan, 12 October–20 December 1965
 Udorn Royal Thai Air Force Base, Thailand, 24 July 1966
 Ubon Royal Thai Air Force Base, Thailand, 2 August 1967 – 8 August 1974
 Holloman Air Force Base, New Mexico, 1 January 1977 – 19 February 1991
 Holloman Air Force Base, New Mexico, 12 May 1993 – 1 April 1997
 Randolph Air Force Base, Texas, 14 May 1998
 Moody Air Force Base, Georgia, 2 October 2001
 Randolph Air Force Base (later Joint Base San Antonio-Randolph), Texas, 2 March 2007 – present)

Aircraft

 Lockheed P-38 Lightning (1943–1945)
 North American P-51 Mustang (1944–1945, 1952–1953)
 Republic P-47 Thunderbolt (1945)
 North American F-86 Sabre (1953–1955)
 North American F-100 Super Sabre (1954–1959)
 Lockheed F-104 Starfighter (1959–1967)
 McDonnell Douglas F-4 Phantom II (1967–1974)
 Northrop T-38 Talon (1977–1991, 1993–1997, 1998 – present)

References

 Notes

 Citations

Bibliography
 
 
 
 

Military units and formations in Texas
0435